Indonesia Update is an Indonesian news program which broadcasts on Kompas TV. The program is about events and issues in various regions of Indonesia and updates to the latest traffic CCTV monitoring from various locations in Indonesia.

References

External links 

 
 

Indonesian-language television shows
Indonesian television news shows
2010s Indonesian television series
2016 Indonesian television series debuts
Kompas TV original programming
Mass media in Indonesia stubs
Asian television show stubs